Congregation B'nai Israel (בני ישראל in Hebrew) is a Jewish synagogue located in Galveston, Texas, USA. Organized by German Jewish immigrants in 1868, it is the oldest Jewish Reform congregation and the second chartered Jewish congregation in the state (Houston had the first).

By the Galveston Movement, from 1907 to 1914, it helped attract thousands of eastern European Jewish immigrants to the city, Gulf Coast, and the middle region of the United States.

History 
German Jews were among the many immigrants to Galveston from the German principalities in the 1840s; through their benevolent society, they established the first Jewish cemetery in Texas here in 1852. They held the first organized Jewish services in the state in Galveston in 1856.  These two endeavors culminated in their organizing Congregation B'nai Israel in 1868 and its chartering in 1870.

The congregation has the distinction of being the first Jewish Reform congregation chartered in Texas, as well as the second Jewish congregation founded in the state.  On June 20, 1875, the congregation voted to become one of the charter members of the Union of American Hebrew Congregations (now known as the Union for Reform Judaism.)  It organized a school in 1869 and, by 1877, included Hebrew as a requirement of its curriculum.

Abraham Cohen Labatt, one of the pioneers of Reform Judaism in the United States, moved to Galveston in 1878 and joined the congregation.  He was an active member until his death in 1899.

Beginning in 1888, Rabbi Henry Cohen led the congregation for more than five decades, through periods of rapid immigration of Jews from eastern Europe and two world wars. In addition, he provided leadership and care to people of all religions in the aftermath of the Galveston Hurricane of 1900, which destroyed many homes on the island and killed 6,000 people. He rallied members of the congregation to care for others.

B'nai Israel and the Galveston Movement
Rabbi Cohen is also credited with founding the Galveston Movement, which operated between 1907 and 1914. He organized Galveston's Jewish Immigration Information Office. The city was a major port of entry for immigrants. The Movement wanted to attract Jews fleeing Russia and eastern Europe to the Gulf Coast and away from crowded East Coast cities; they wanted to attract more Jewish settlement to the middle of the United States. Members of the congregation met all of the ships that docked carrying Jewish immigrants at the Port of Galveston. They helped to direct many of the passengers to new homes in Texas and beyond, and aided them in finding housing and work, as well as adjusting to American life.

Through the combined efforts of Rabbi Cohen and others, historians estimate that more than ten thousand Jewish immigrants passed through Galveston, with many settling there, in Texas and the South.

Rabbis
Since its founding, the congregation has been served by thirteen rabbis:
 Alexander Rosenspitz (1868–70)
 Abraham Blum, MD (1871–85)
 Joseph Silverman (1885–88)
 Rabbi Henry Cohen (1888–1950; Rabbi Emeritus 1950-1952)
 Leo Stillpass (1950–55)
 Stanley Dreyfus (1956–65)
 Robert Blinder (1965–69)
 Samuel M. Stahl (1969–76)
 Jimmy Kessler (1976–81)
 Alan Greenbaum (1981–85)
 Martin Levy (1985–89)
 Jimmy Kessler (1989–2014; Rabbi Emeritus 2014-)
 Rabbi Marshal Klaven (2014-2018)

 Rabbi Matthew Cohen (2018-2022)
 Rabbi Peter Kessler (2022-)

In 1976, Jimmy Kessler was the first native Texan to assume the leadership of the congregation.

Temple
By 1870, the congregation was ready to build a sanctuary and invited Mr. Tuck, the grand master of the Masonic Lodge of Texas, to lay the cornerstone. They had invited Rabbi Jacobs of the New Orleans Portuguese Jewish Nefutzot Yehudah Congregation (later part of Touro Synagogue) to officiate; historians believe this was the first occasion when an ordained rabbi led a religious meeting in Texas. 

The congregation continued to grow and, by the late 1880s, found they needed a new synagogue. They replaced the old structure on site. They commissioned Nicholas J. Clayton, who was a notable Texas architect of religious structures. His Victorian design of 1890 produced an ornately detailed synagogue that became a landmark in the city.  The congregation used this building until selling it in the 1950s to the Masonic Lodge and moving to another new synagogue. The Masons simplified parts of the facade, but the basic structure remains.

Henry Cohen Community House

As the congregation grew in the twentieth century, it needed space for its activities. It decided to build a center in 1928; the Henry Cohen Community House was named in honor of their Rabbi Henry Cohen. The community house was built on the lot next to the 1890s temple. The congregation occupied this complex until the 1950s, when it moved to a new synagogue outside of downtown. It was designed by Holocaust survivor Tibor Beerman.

The entry to the community house has a carved limestone portal and a gate, which both feature the "Magen David" as the primary iconographic element. After the Congregation built a new synagogue, it sold the Clayton temple and community house to the Masons. They adapted the buildings for use as their Masonic Temple.

See also 

 Galveston Movement
 Galveston, Texas
 Jewish Texan
 Rabbi Henry Cohen
 History of the Jews in Galveston, Texas
 Texas Jewish Historical Society
 Oldest synagogues in the United States

References

External links
Congregation B'nai Israel
Handbook of Texas Online
Union for Reform Judaism
Texas Jewish Historical Society
Jewish Federation of Greater Houston
Jewish Community Centers of North America

1868 establishments in Texas
Ashkenazi Jewish culture in Texas
German-American culture in Texas
German-Jewish culture in the United States
Religious organizations established in 1868
Jewish-American history
Jews and Judaism in Galveston, Texas
Henry Cohen Community House
Reform synagogues in Texas
Russian-Jewish culture in the United States